"Keep It Hot" is a 1980 funk and disco song by Cheryl Lynn. The song was released as a single in 1980 from Lynn's 1979 album In Love. The song peaked at number 12 on the US Dance Chart in 1980.

Track listing
Side A
 "Keep It Hot" - 5:25
Side B
 "In Love" - 3:48

References

1980 singles
Cheryl Lynn songs
1979 songs
Columbia Records singles